Teltschik Tower is a 41-metre-high observation tower built of wood in Wilhelmsfeld, Germany.

The tower was built by Walter Teltschik, a citizen of Wilhelmsfeld, in remembrance of his origins in the Kuhländchen near Brno, a part of the former Sudetenland (modern-day Czech Republic). From the top of the tower there is an excellent view over the hills of the Odenwald (mountainous region in southern Germany) and as well to the Rhine Valley near Mannheim and the Black Forest.

External links
http://www.skyscraperpage.com/diagrams/?b42037
 

Observation towers in Baden-Württemberg
Buildings and structures in Rhein-Neckar-Kreis